Scânteia is a commune in Iași County, Western Moldavia, Romania. It is composed of seven villages: Bodești, Boroșești, Ciocârlești, Lunca Rateș, Rediu, Scânteia and Tufeștii de Sus.

Natives
 Florin Lambagiu
 Neculai Alexandru Ursu

Road accident

In 2009, Romania's deadliest road accident for fifteen years, a bus and train collision, killed at least 13 people in Scânteia.

References

Communes in Iași County
Localities in Western Moldavia